Paul Barr "Coach" Blair (May 19, 1949 – November 8, 2006) was a swim coach who specialized in sprint training. He was known for the many sprinters he trained to the highest level of swimming competition. Blair was one of the first coaches to emphasize that in order to sprint, you must practice sprinting. In fact, most sprint coaches today have based their swim workouts on Blair's method. Coach Blair has trained many notable swimmers, including John Hargis (Olympic gold medalist), Steve Crocker, Doug Boyd, Kicker Vencill, Matt Weghorst, Bobby O'Bryan, Tom Genz, Noel Strauss, and Manuel Twillie. 

Blair was known around the world for his sprinting methods, which became apparent through the accomplishments of his swim team, the Arkansas Dolphins, based in Little Rock, Arkansas. Blair led the Dolphins to a men's U.S. Open title in 1988 and then a men's National title in 1989 in less than ten years as head coach.  It was the smallest team ever to win a United States National Championship.  He was also an eight-time USA National Team coach, and coached the Arkansas Dolphins to 10 Region VIII Championship titles and 57 Arkansas State Age Group Championship titles, making him the second winningest coach ever of all sports in the state of Arkansas.  Blair individually coached 6 US National Champions, 1 US Open National Champion, 12 US Junior National Champions, 2 Olympic Festival Gold Medalists, 35 National Age Group Champions, 17 National Age Group Record Holders, 9 Masters National Champions, 1 Pan American Silver Medalist, 25 World Ranked Swimmers, 25 Olympic Trials Qualifiers, 4 Pan Pacific Team Members, 6 Olympic Swimmers, 1 World Championships Silver Medalist, and 1 Olympic Gold Medalist.

Blair was the head coach and owner of the Arkansas Dolphins Swim Team. He was also associate head coach for the Arkansas–Little Rock Trojans Women's Swim Team. 

Blair was inducted into the West Liberty State College Hall of Fame in 1991, and the Arkansas Swimming Hall of Fame in 1992.  In 2004, he received the International Swimming Hall of Fame Yutaka Terao Award, and was posthumously inducted into the American Swimming Coaches Hall of Fame in 2008.

He served on the Olympic International Operations Committee, the International Swimming Hall of Fame Board of Governors, the State of Arkansas Governor's Council for Sport and Fitness, the USA Olympic Operations Committee and is past vice-president of the American Swim Coaches Association. He served as the head coach for the USA World Championship team, as coach for the National Junior Team at the Youth Olympic Festival, and as men's coach at the World University Games. He was a Nike advisory coach and USA National Team coach. 

In the fall of 2006, his health declined.  After a three-year battle with prostate cancer, Blair died on the morning of November 8, 2006.

Team championships 

1988 US Open Men’s Team Champions Results
1989 US Men’s Team National Champions Results
57 Arkansas State Age Group Championships
10 time Region VIII Team Champions

Individual Achievements 

6 US National Champions
1 US Open National Champion
12 Junior National Champions
2 Olympic Festival Gold Medalists
35 National Age Group Champions
17 National Age Group Records
7 Masters National Champions
1 Pan American Silver Medalist
25 World Ranked Swimmers
25 Olympic Trials Qualifiers
4 Pan Pacific Team Members
6 Olympic Swimmers
1 World Team Silver Medalist
1 Olympic Gold Medalist

External links
 Obituary

1949 births
2006 deaths
Deaths from prostate cancer
American swimming coaches
Sportspeople from Arkansas
Deaths from cancer in Arkansas